Sminthurus fitchi is a species of globular springtail in the family Sminthuridae.

References

Collembola
Articles created by Qbugbot
Insects described in 1896